USS Kingbird may refer to the following ships of the United States Navy:

 , was acquired by the US Navy 26 December 1940 and placed out of service 7 June 1946
 , was launched 21 May 1954 and scrapped in 1973

United States Navy ship names